Chinese braille refers to Standard Mandarin braille systems:

Mainland Chinese Braille, for Putonghua in China
Two-Cell Chinese Braille, for Putonghua in China
Taiwanese Braille, for Guoyu in Taiwan

See also
Cantonese Braille